This is a list of fellows of the Royal Society elected in 1995.

Fellows

Martin Arthur Bennett
Iain Donald Campbell (1941 – 2014)
Johnson Robin Cann
Keith Frederick Chater
Francis Edward Corrigan
Edward Brian Davies
Graham Dixon-Lewis  (died 2010)
Richard Salisbury Ellis
Graham Douglas Farquhar
Jeffrey Barry Harborne  (1928–2002)
Dame Julia Stretton Higgins
Jonathan Charles Howard
Guy Antony Jameson
Jack Henri Kaplan
Gurdev Khush
Anthony Ledwith
Frank Matthews Leslie  (1935–2000)
Christopher John Marshall
Robin Marshall
Paul James Mason
David Andrew Barclay Miller
Richard Alan North
Timothy John Pedley
Geoffrey James Pert
Sir Keith Peters
Jeremy David Pickett-Heaps
Richard John Roberts
Sir Joseph Rotblat  (1908–2005)
Jeremy Keith Morris Sanders
Robert Malcolm Simmons
Ian William Murison Smith
Peter Henry Andrews Sneath  (1923–2011)
Laszlo Solymar
Roger John Tayler  (1929–1997)
Richard Lawrence Taylor
Shirley Marie Tilghman
Sir John Ernest Walker
Stephen Craig West
Colin George Windsor
Andrew Hamilton Wyllie

Foreign members

Gertrude Belle Elion  (1918–1999)
Ugo Fano  (1912–2001)
Salome Gluecksohn-Waelsch  (died 2007)
Rita Levi-Montalcini  (1909–2012)
Calvin Forrest Quate
John Archibald Wheeler  (1911–2008)

References

1995
1995 in science
1995 in the United Kingdom